USS Salmon has been the name of more than one United States Navy ship, and may refer to:

USS Salmon (SS-19), a submarine in commission from 1910 to 1922, renamed  in 1911
, a submarine in commission from 1938 to 1945
, later SS-573, then AGSS-573, then again SS-573, a submarine in commission from 1956 to 1977

United States Navy ship names